Parallel is a 2018 Canadian science fiction thriller film. The film stars Aml Ameen, Martin Wallström, Georgia King, Mark O'Brien and Alyssa Diaz.

Plot
The film opens with an elderly couple in bed. Upon hearing her dog crying, the wife leaves her bedroom and goes to investigate. She finds her dog fine but when she goes to feed him she is killed by a masked intruder. The intruder removes her mask to reveal she is an exact duplicate of the wife. The intruder then redresses and (re)joins the husband in bed.

Next four friends (Aml Ameen as Devin, Martin Wallström as Noel, Georgia King as Leena and Mark O'Brien as Josh) are running a software startup. Devin and Noel are pitching to investors when they are given an impossible deadline. Their investors have met with a similar company which they like. The guys realise they have been betrayed by a programmer who they recently considered hiring called Seth (Chad Krowchuk). Devin and Noel return and give Leena and Josh the bad news. The foursome decide to drown their sorrows in the local bar. While there they learn from the barmaid Carmen (Alyssa Diaz) that their home is rumoured to be haunted after the previous owner mysteriously disappeared.

The four go home and discuss if is possible to finish the app in the timeframe the investors gave them. They agree it cannot be done but Josh gets angry when Devin mentions that he is going to give up and just get a job. In the ensuing scuffle they damage the wall and uncover a hidden room. While exploring the attic they find a strange mirror, while messing around in the room, Josh discovers the mirror is some form of portal. After Josh steps in and disappears, the four get worried. He returns seconds later telling a fantastic story about a different world and how he was there for 15 minutes. Noel realises the mirror is a portal that connects to different universes. The four decide to use the mirror to slow down time so they can complete the app. With the app complete, they give it to their investors and then drive past Seth mocking him.

Over drinks the four discuss how they can use the portal to their advantage. Leena also uncovers the missing woman's diaries and learns her name was Marissa and that she lost her husband and was using the mirror to reconnect with her deceased husband who wasn't deceased in another universe. Noel proposes to the group that they use the portal to steal ideas, Devin protests that this is what Seth did to them but loses the argument. He later performs an internet search on his father who we learn died after committing suicide due to a corruption scandal.

Josh starts to use the mirror to seduce women, Leena uses it so she can copy great works of art and sell them off as her own, while Noel becomes a "visionary" reselling ideas for technology. All four of them become successful and wealthy. At an event, they are approached by a suspicious Seth. Josh intervenes after Seth gets angry and insults Devin about his father. Noel takes Devin through the mirror to another universe where they enter Seth's house. Noel destroys Seth's TV and Laptop before inviting Devin to beat up Seth. Devin refuses and makes them leave, he learns that Noel doesn't consider people in alternate universes to be real. Devin then goes through Marissa's diary and learns that Marissa lost her mind searching for her dead husband and he begins to grow concerned for Noel.

To cheer Devin up, Josh takes him to an alternative universe and in this world Josh manages to successfully chat up Carmen and bed her. Devin goes downstairs to listen to music but fails to hear Carmen's boyfriend returning, who proceeds to shoot Josh. Devin carries a mortally wounded Josh back to their world where he bleeds out in the attic and dies. Noel doesn't call 911 as this is happening.
The remaining three panic about what to do and reluctantly agree with Noel to kidnap and swap Josh from another world with the dead body.

The alternative Josh is drugged and wakes up in the new world seeing his three friends packing up. The three convince Josh that he got drunk and doesn't remember getting rich and getting hired into his dream job. This has been fixed up by Noel and Josh drives away to take up the job. 
Devin tries to find an alternative universe where his father is still alive, eventually succeeding and meeting him. 
Noel continues to steal ideas from different worlds and starts to spy on Devin and Leena.

Later Devin and Leena grow intimate and share a night of passion which Noel sees.
The next morning Devin has seemingly disappeared in search of his father. 
Noel disposes of Devin's phone in the trash and Leena recovers it and uses it to track Devin's movements to a lakeside cabin. Devin tells her that Noel launched a lawsuit for patents against him. Devin has no recollection of sleeping with Leena and Leena realises that Noel has killed the real Devin. Noel has imported a new Devin from an alternate universe and left him at the cabin while he figures out how to reintroduce him into the group. Leena leaves the new Devin with the original Devin's phone.

Back at the house, Leena confronts Noel who shows her some amazing technical devices he has stolen from alternate universes and says they should get back together.

Josh sneaks into the house and threatens Noel with a gun. Josh has become unhinged as he can't work out what is going on in his life. In a struggle with Noel his gun goes off badly wounding Noel. Just then another copy of Noel appears with a futuristic gun, he shoots the injured Noel and Josh and the gun vaporises the bodies.
 
Downstairs, Noel goes to Leena and tries to prove to her that he has always loved her, showing her evidence of the many alternate Leenas he has met. Leena distracts Noel and grabs the futuristic gun but it fails to go off. She runs for the attic where the new alt Devin appears up the stairs just in time to save her from Noel's clutches. Devin fights with Noel who is shot and then jumps into the mirror. Just as Noel steps back through into their universe, Leena closes the mirror trapping him between universes and slicing him in half.

Devin and Leena embrace and they dispose of the body. Leena smashes the mirror. The two leave to start a new life. When Leena is in the restroom of a gas station there is a flash of light in the mirror. She gets back into the car with Devin but she's an alternate who can't remember the music they were just playing on the journey.

Cast
 Aml Ameen as Devin
 Martin Wallström as Noel
 Georgia King as Leena
 Mark O'Brien as Josh
 Alyssa Diaz as Carmen
 Kathleen Quinlan as Marissa
 David Harewood as Devin's father
 Shannon Chan-Kent as Jessica

Release
It premiered at the 2018 Brussels International Fantastic Film Festival.

Accolades

References

External links
 

2018 films
2018 science fiction films
2018 thriller films
English-language Canadian films
Canadian science fiction thriller films
Films about parallel universes
2010s English-language films
2010s Canadian films